Stephanie Strom (born in Dickinson, Texas) is an American journalist who was a correspondent for The New York Times from December 2002 to 2017.

Biography
Strom received her B.A. from Northwestern University in 1985 and an M.S. from Columbia University Graduate School of Journalism in 1986. She began her career at the Times as a clerk in the Washington bureau.

Strom's previous posts at the Times include: research assistant to A.M. Rosenthal; metropolitan reporter; business/financial reporter focusing on retail and toy industries and Seventh Avenue; business/financial reporter covering Wall Street and the financial industry; business correspondent in the Tokyo bureau; correspondent focusing on executive compensation; and correspondent focusing on philanthropy and nonprofits.

Notes

1960s births
Living people
American business writers
Women business writers
American economics writers
American women journalists
Columbia University Graduate School of Journalism alumni
Northwestern University alumni
People from Dickinson, Texas
Journalists from Texas
20th-century American journalists
20th-century American women
21st-century American women